This is a survey of the postage stamps and postal history of Sri Lanka, formerly known as Ceylon.

Sri Lanka is an island country in South Asia, located about 31 km off the southern coast of India. After over two thousand years of rule by local kingdoms, parts of Sri Lanka were colonized by Portugal and the Netherlands beginning in the 16th century, before control of the entire country passed to Britain in 1815. A nationalist political movement arose in the country in the early 20th century with the aim of obtaining political independence, which was eventually granted by the British after peaceful negotiations in 1948. The country became a republic and adopted its current name in 1972.

British colonial stamps 

The first stamps for British Ceylon were issued on 1 April 1857.
The stamp features a portrait of Queen Victoria and is brown in colour. It is a 6 pence value used to send a half ounce letter from Ceylon to England. Eight more stamps were issued in year 1857, all featuring the portrait of Queen Victoria. One of the 5 stamps that were issued on 23 April 1859 is considered to be the most valuable stamp in Sri Lanka: it is a 4 pence with a dark pink colour known as the 'Dull Rose'.

Stamps of Sri Lanka 

Sri Lanka is the only country to include details in a stamp in three languages viz. Sinhala, Tamil and English. The first stamps marked Sri Lanka were issued on 22 May 1972.

Souvenir sheets 
Sri Lanka has been issuing souvenir sheets since 1966. Many of the earliest souvenir sheets issued by Sri Lanka are valuable. Sri Lanka issues souvenir sheets each year on many different themes.

First souvenir sheet 
The first souvenir sheet of Sri Lanka was issued on 5 February 1966 on the topic 'Typical Birds of Ceylon' and was imperforate. This sheet was reissued on 15 September 1967 to commemorate the 1st National Stamp Exhibition of Sri Lanka, overprinted 'FIRST NATIONAL STAMP EXHIBITION 1967'. Subsequently many souvenir sheets were issued, on many themes mostly perforated.

Other souvenir sheets 

On 10 February 1981, a four stamp Surcharged souvenir sheet on 'Quadrupeds of Sri Lanka' was issued. The 4 stamps in the sheet were surcharged at the issue.

A practice of issuing souvenir sheets containing the Wesak stamps started from year 1981.

On 21 October 1981 a souvenir sheet was issued to mark the Sri Lankan visit of Queen Elizabeth and was the first souvenir sheet issued to mark the visit of a distinguished foreign head of state.

On 2 December 1982 a souvenir sheet was issued to commemorate the 125th anniversary of the 1st postage Stamp of Sri Lanka. This was the 1st souvenir sheet of 2 stamps of different denominations; 50 cents and 2.50 rupees with a sheet value of Rs. 5.

On 1 April 2007 to commemorate the 150th anniversary of the 1st postage stamp of Sri Lanka a souvenir sheet was issued in both perforate and imperforate types.

All the souvenir sheets issued so far were rectangular in shape. The first irregular shape souvenir sheet was issued on 22 May 2001 on 'Seashells of Sri Lanka' for the World Biodiversity Day. The sheet was in the shape of a seashell.

Present-day souvenir sheets 
Now, Sri Lanka issues several souvenir sheets annually. A souvenir sheet is almost always issued with Wesak and Christmas stamps.  Sometimes, choosing one stamp from a set of stamps, a small miniature sheet, containing that single stamp is issued. Because they are attractive, they have become favourites among collectors.

See also 
 General Post Office, Colombo
 List of people on stamps of Sri Lanka
 Post and Telegraph Signals
 Sri Lanka Post
 Postal museum, Colombo

References

Further reading 
Crofton, C.S.F. The Fiscal and Telegraph Stamps of Ceylon. Ed. B. Gordon Jones. London: Bridger & Kay for The Philatelic Society of India, 1911.
Rodrigo, Chandra, Rodrigo's Catalogue of Ceylon/Sri Lanka Postal Stationery Part I - Air Mail Letter Sheets, Dr Chandra Rodrigo, 2008
Rodrigo, Chandra, Rodrigo's Catalogue of Ceylon/Sri Lanka Postal Stationery Part II - Postal Cards, Letter Cards, Letter Sheets, Wrappers, P.T.P.O. Wrappers, Dr Chandra Rodrigo, 2010, 224 pages, 
Proud, Edward B., The Postal History of Ceylon, Proud-Bailey Co Ltd, 2006, 

History of Sri Lanka by topic
Postal system of Sri Lanka
Sri Lanka